Clivina szekessyi is a species of ground beetle in the subfamily Scaritinae. It was described by Kult in 1951.

References

szekessyi
Beetles described in 1951